Jeremy Adduono (born August 4, 1978) is a Canadian former professional ice hockey winger. He was drafted in the seventh round, 184th overall, by the Buffalo Sabres in the 1997 NHL Entry Draft from the Ontario Hockey League's Sudbury Wolves.

Adduono performed well for the Sabres in a rookie camp in 1998, and he debuted with Buffalo's American Hockey League affiliate, the Rochester Americans, in the 1999–2000 season.

He played with the Americans for three seasons and spent one more AHL season with the Bridgeport Sound Tigers before moving to Europe to play in Germany's Deutsche Eishockey Liga with the Cologne Sharks. After three seasons with the Sharks and one with the Iserlohn Roosters, Adduono joined HC Pustertal Wölfe of Italy's Serie A in the 2007–08 season. In 2008, he moved to Ravensburg Towerstars based in Ravensburg, Germany, who play in the German 2. Bundesliga, where he played two seasons.

As of 2016, Adduono is the head coach of the Thunder Bay North Stars in the Superior International Junior Hockey League.

Career statistics

References

External links

1978 births
Bridgeport Sound Tigers players
Buffalo Sabres draft picks
Canada men's national ice hockey team players
Canadian ice hockey left wingers
Canadian sportspeople of Italian descent
HC Pustertal Wölfe players
Ice hockey people from Ontario
Iserlohn Roosters players
Kölner Haie players
Living people
Ravensburg Towerstars players
Rochester Americans players
Sportspeople from Thunder Bay
Sudbury Wolves players
Thunder Bay Flyers players
Canadian expatriate ice hockey players in Italy
Canadian expatriate ice hockey players in Germany